Simon Williams (born 1920) was a Jamaican weightlifter. He competed in the men's featherweight event at the 1948 Summer Olympics.

References

External links
 

1920 births
Possibly living people
Jamaican male weightlifters
Olympic weightlifters of Jamaica
Weightlifters at the 1948 Summer Olympics